The following is a list of selected rivers in Nagaland.

List 
 Chathe
 Dhansiri
 Doyang

See also 
 List of rivers
 Geography of Nagaland

References